The Hephthalites, sometimes called the White Huns (also known as the White Hunas, in Iranian as the Spet Xyon and in Sanskrit as the Sveta-huna), were a people who lived in Central Asia during the 5th to 8th centuries CE. They formed an empire, the Imperial Hephthalites, and were militarily important from 450 CE, when they defeated the Kidarites, to 560 CE, when combined forces from the First Turkic Khaganate and the Sasanian Empire defeated them. After 560 CE, they established "principalities" in the area of Tokharistan, under the suzerainty of the Western Turks (in the areas north of the Oxus) and of the Sasanian Empire (in the areas south of the Oxus), before the Tokhara Yabghus took over in 625.

The Imperial Hephthalites, based in Bactria, expanded eastwards to the Tarim Basin, westwards to Sogdia and southwards through Afghanistan, but they never went beyond the Hindu-Kush, which was occupied by the Alchon Huns, previously mistakenly regarded as an extension of the Hephthalites. They were a tribal confederation and included both nomadic and settled urban communities.  They formed part of the four major states known collectively as Xyon (Xionites) or Huna, being preceded by the Kidarites and by the Alkhon, and succeeded by the Nezak Huns and by the First Turkic Khaganate. All of these Hunnic peoples have often been linked to the Huns who invaded Eastern Europe during the same period, and/or have been referred to as "Huns", but scholars have reached no consensus about any such connection.

The stronghold of the Hephthalites was Tokharistan (present-day southern Uzbekistan and northern Afghanistan) on the northern slopes of the Hindu Kush, and their capital was probably at Kunduz, having come from the east, possibly from the area of Badakhshan. By 479 the Hephthalites had conquered Sogdia and driven the Kidarites eastwards, and by 493 they had captured parts of present-day Dzungaria and the Tarim Basin (in present-day Northwest China). The Alchon Huns, formerly confused with the Hephthalites, expanded into Northern India as well.

The sources for Hephthalite history are sparse and the opinions of historians differ. There is no king-list, and historians are not sure how the group arose or what language they initially spoke. They seem to have called themselves Ebodalo (ηβοδαλο, hence Hephthal), often abbreviated Eb (ηβ), a name they wrote in the Bactrian script on some of their coins. The origin of the name "Hephthalites" is unknown, it may stem either from a Khotanese word *Hitala meaning "Strong", from hypothetical Sogdian *Heβtalīt, plural of *Heβtalak, or from postulated Middle Persian *haft āl "the Seven Al".

Name and ethnonyms 

An important and unique seal, held in the private collection of Professor Dr. Aman ur Rahman and published by Nicholas Sims-Williams in 2011, shows an early Hepthalite ruler with a round beardless face and slanted almond-shaped eyes, wearing a radiate crown with a single crescent, and framed by the Bactrian script legend ηβοδαλο ββγο ("The Lord [Yabghu] of the Hephthalites"). The seal is dated to the end 5th century- early 6th century CE. The ethnic name "Ebodalo", and title "Ebodalo Yabghu", have also been discovered in contemporary Bactrian documents of the Kingdom of Rob describing administrative functions under the Hephthalites.

Byzantine Greek sources referred to them as Hephthalitae, Abdel or Avdel. To the Armenians, the Hephthalites were Hephthal, Hep't'al & Tetal and sometimes identified with the Kushans. To the Persians, Hephthalites are Hephtal, Hephtel, & Hēvtāls. To Arabs, Hephthalites were Haital, Hetal, Heithal, Haiethal, Heyâthelites, (al-)Hayațila (هياطلة), and sometimes identified as Turks. According to Togan (1985), the form Haytal in Persian and Arabic sources in the first period was a clerical error for Habtal, as Arabic -b- resembles -y-.

In Chinese chronicles, the Hephthalites are called Ye-tha-i-li-to (simp. 厌带夷栗陁; trad. 厭帶夷栗陀; pinyin: Yàndàiyílìtuó), or the more usual abbreviated form Yada 嚈噠 (pinyin: Yèdā), or 滑 (pinyin: Huá). The latter name has been given various Latinised renderings, including Yeda, Ye-ta, Ye-tha; Ye-dā and Yanda. The corresponding Cantonese and Korean names Yipdaat and Yeoptal, which preserve aspects of the Middle Chinese pronunciation (roughly yep-daht) better than the modern Mandarin pronunciation, are more consistent with the Greek Hephthalite. Some Chinese chroniclers suggest that the root Hephtha- (as in Ye-ta-i-li-to or Yada) was technically a title equivalent to "emperor", while Hua was the name of the dominant tribe.

In Ancient India, names such as Hephthalite were unknown. The Hephthalites were apparently part of, or offshoots of, people known in India as Hunas or Turushkas, although these names may have referred to broader groups or neighbouring peoples. Ancient Sanskrit text Pravishyasutra mentions a group of people named Havitaras but it is unclear whether the term denotes Hephthalites. The Indians also used the expression "White Huns" (Sveta Huna) for the Hephthalites.

Geographical origin and expansion 

According to recent scholarship, the stronghold of the Hephthalites was always Tokharistan on the northern slopes of the Hindu Kush, in what is present-day southern Uzbekistan and northern Afghanistan. Their capital was probably at Kunduz, which was known to the 11th-century scholar al-Biruni as War-Walīz, a possible origin of one of the names given by the Chinese to Hephthalites: 滑 (Middle Chinese (ZS) *ɦˠuat̚ > standard Chinese: Huá).

The Hephthalites may have come from the East, through the Pamir Mountains, possibly from the area of Badakhshan. Alternatively, they may have migrated from the Altai region, among the waves of invading Huns.

Following their westward or southward expansion, the Hephthalites settled in Bactria, and displaced the Alchon Huns, who expanded into Northern India. The Hephthalites came into contact with the Sasanian Empire, and were involved in helping militarily Peroz I seize the throne from his brother Hormizd III.

Later, in the late 5th century, the Hephthalites expanded into vast areas of Central Asia, and occupied the Tarim Basin as far as Turfan, taking control of the area from the Ruanruans, who had been collecting heavy tribute from the oasis cities, but were now weakening under the assaults of the Chinese Wei Dynasty.

Origins and characteristics 

There are several theories regarding the origins of the Hephthalites, with the Iranian and Altaic theories being the most prominent.

According to most specialist scholars, the Hephthalites adopted Bactrian as their official language, just as the Kushans had done, following their settlement in Bactria/Tokharistan. Bactrian was an Eastern Iranian language, but was written in the Greek alphabet, a remnant of the Greco-Bactrian kingdom in the 3rd–2nd century BCE. Bactrian, beyond being an official language, was also the language of the local populations ruled by the Hephthalites.

The Hephthalites inscribed their coins in Bactrian, the titles they held were Bactrian, such as XOAΔHO or Šao, and of probable Chinese origin, such as Yabghu, the names of Hephthalite rulers given in Ferdowsi's Shahnameh are Iranian, and gem inscriptions and other evidence shows that the official language of the Hephthalite elite was East Iranian. In 1959, Kazuo Enoki proposed that the Hephthalites were probably Indo-European (East) Iranians who originated in Bactria/Tokharistan, based on the fact that ancient sources generally located them in the area between Sogdia and the Hindu-Kush, and the Hephthalites had some Iranian characteristics. Richard Nelson Frye cautiously accepted Enoki's hypothesis, while at the same time stressing that the Hephthalites "were probably a mixed horde". According to the Encyclopaedia Iranica and Encyclopaedia of Islam, the Hephthalites possibly originated in what is today Afghanistan.

A few scholars, such as Marquart and Grousset proposed Proto-Mongolic origins. Yu Taishan traced the Hephthalites' origins to the Xianbei and further to Goguryeo.

In effect, the Hephthalites may have been a confederation of various people, speaking different languages. According to Richard Nelson Frye:

Relation to European Huns 
According to Martin Schottky, the Hephthalites apparently had no direct connection with the European Huns, but may have been causally related with their movement. The tribes in question deliberately called themselves "Huns" in order to frighten their enemies. On the contrary, de la Vaissière considers that the Hepthalites were part of the great Hunnic migrations of the 4th century CE from the Altai region that also reached Europe, and that these Huns "were the political, and partly cultural, heirs of the Xiongnu". This massive migration was apparently triggered by climate change, with aridity affecting the mountain grazing grounds of the Altay Mountains during the 4th century CE. According to Amanda Lomazoff and Aaron Ralby, there is a high synchronicity between the "reign of terror" of Attila in the west and the southern expansion of the Hephthalites, with extensive territorial overlap between the Huns and the Hephthalites in Central Asia.

The 6th-century Byzantine historian Procopius of Caesarea (History of the Wars, Book I. ch. 3), related them to the Huns in Europe, but insisted on cultural and sociological differences, highlighting the sophistication of the Hephthalites:

Chinese chronicles 

The Hephthalites were first known to the Chinese in 456 CE, when a Hephthalite embassy arrived at the Chinese court of the Northern Wei. The Chinese used various names for the Hephthalites, such as Hua (滑), Ye-tha-i-li-to (simp. 厌带夷栗陁, trad. 厭帶夷粟陁) or more briefly Ye-da (嚈噠). Ancient imperial Chinese chronicles give various explanations about the origins of the Hephthalites:
 They were descendants "of the Gaoju or the Da Yuezhi" according to the earliest chronicles such as the Weishu or the Beishu.
 They were descendants "of the Da Yuezhi tribes", according to many later chronicles.
 The ancient historian Pei Ziye conjectured that the "Hua" (滑) may be descendants of a Jushi general of the 2nd century CE because that general was named "Bahua" (八滑). This etymological fantasy was adopted by the Liangshu chronicle (Volume 30 and Volume 54).
 Another etymological fantasy appeared in the Tongdian, reporting an account by the traveller Wei Jie according to which the Hephthalites may have been the descendants of the Kangju because a Kangju general of the Han period happened to be named "Yitian".

Kazuo Enoki made a first groundbreaking analysis of the Chinese sources in 1959, suggesting that the Hephthalites were a local tribe of the Tokharistan (Bactria) region, with their origin in the nearby Western Himalayas. He also used as an argument the presence of numerous Bactrian names among the Hephthalites, and the fact that the Chinese reported that they practiced polyandry, a well-known West Himalayan cultural trait.

According to a recent reappraisal of the Chinese sources by de la Vaissière (2003), only the Turkic Gaoju origin of the Hephthalites should be retained as indicative of their primary ethnicity, and the mention of the Da Yuezhi only stems from the fact that, at the time, the Hephthalites had already settled in the former Da Yuezhi territory of Bactria, where they are known to have used the Eastern Iranian Bactrian language. The earliest Chinese source on this encounter, the near-contemporary chronicles of the Northern Wei (Weishu) as quoted in the later Tongdian, reports that they migrated southward from the Altai region circa 360 CE:

The Gaoju (高車 lit. "High Cart"), also known as Tiele, were early Turkic speakers related to the earlier Dingling, who were once conquered by the Xiongnu. Weishu also mentioned the linguistic and ethnic proximity between the Gaoju and the Xiongnu. de la Vaissière proposes that the Hephthalites had originally been one Oghuric-speaking tribe who belonged the Gaoju/Tiele confederation. This and several later Chinese chronicles also report that the Hephthalites may have originated from the Da Yuezhi, probably because of their settlement in the former Da Yuezhi territory of Bactria. Later Chinese sources become quite confused about the origins of the Hephthalites, and this may be due to their progressive assimilation of Bactrian culture and language once they settled there.

According to the Beishi, describing the situation in the first half of the 6th century CE around the time Song Yun visited Central Asia, the language of the Hephthalites was different from that of the Ruanruan, Gaoju or other tribes of Central Asia, but that probably reflects their acculturation and adoption of the Bactrian language since their arrival in Bactria in the 4th century CE. The Liangshu and Liang Zhigongtu do explain that the Hephthalites originally had no written language and adopted the hu (local, "Barbarian") alphabet, in this case, the Bactrian script.

Overall, de la Vaissière considers that the Hephthalites were part of the great Hunnic migrations of the 4th century CE from the Altai region that also reached Europe and that these Huns "were the political, and partly cultural, heirs, of the Xiongnu".

Appearance 

The Hepthalites appear in several mural paintings in the area of Tokharistan, especially in banquet scenes at Balalyk tepe and as donors to the Buddha in the ceiling painting of the 35-meter Buddha at the Buddhas of Bamyan. Several of the figures in these paintings have a characteristic appearance, with belted jackets with a unique lapel of their tunic being folded on the right side, a style which became popular under the Hephthalites, the cropped hair, the hair accessories, their distinctive physionomy and their round beardless faces. The figures at Bamyan must represent the donors and potentates who supported the building of the monumental giant Buddha. These remarkable paintings participate "to the artistic tradition of the Hephthalite ruling classes of Tukharistan".

The paintings related to the Hephthalites have often been grouped under the appellation of "Tokharistan school of art", or the "Hephthalite stage in the History of Central Asia Art". The paintings of Tavka Kurgan, of very high quality, also belong to this school of art, and are closely related to other paintings of the Tokharistan school such as Balalyk tepe, in the depiction of clothes, and especially in the treatment of the faces.

This "Hephthalite period" in art, with the caftans with a triangular collar folded on the right, the particular cropped hairstyle, the crowns with crescents, have been found in many of the areas historically occupied and ruled by the Hephthalites, in Sogdia, Bamyan (modern Afghanistan), or in Kucha in the Tarim Basin (modern Xinjiang, China). This points to a "political and cultural unification of Central Asia" with similar artistic styles and iconography, under the rule of the Hephthalites.

History 

The Hephthalites were a vassal state to the Rouran Khaganate until the beginning of the 5th century. There were close contacts between them, although they had different languages and cultures, and the Hephthalites borrowed much of their political organization from Rourans. In particular, the title "Khan", which according to McGovern was original to the Rourans, was borrowed by the Hephthalite rulers. The reason for the migration of the Hephthalites southeast was to avoid a pressure of the Rourans.

The Hephthalites became a significant political entity in Bactria around 450 CE, or sometime before. It has been commonly assumed that the Hephthalites formed a third wave of migrations into Central Asia, after the Chionites (who arrived circa 350 CE) and the Kidarites (who arrived from around 380 CE), but recent studies suggest that instead there may have been a single massive wave of nomadic migrations around 350–360 CE, the "Great Invasion", triggered by climate change and the onset of aridity in the grazing grounds of the Altay region, and that these nomadic tribes vied for supremacy thereafter in their new territories in Southern Central Asia. As they rose to prominence, the Hephthalites displaced the Kidarites and then the Alchon Huns, who expanded into Gandhara and Northern India. 

The Hephthalites also entered into conflict with the Sasanians. The reliefs of the Bandian complex seem to show the initial defeat of the Hephthalites against the Sasanians in 425 CE, and then their alliance with them, from the time of Bahram V (420-438 CE), until they invaded Sasanian territory and destroyed the Bandian complex in 484 CE.

In 456–457 a Hephthalite embassy arrived in China, during the reign of Emperor Wen of the Northern Wei. By 458 they were strong enough to intervene in Persia.

Around 466 they probably took Transoxianan lands from the Kidarites with Persian help but soon took from Persia the area of Balkh and eastern Kushanshahr. In the second half of the fifth century they controlled the deserts of Turkmenistan as far as the Caspian Sea and possibly Merv. By 500 they held the whole of Bactria and the Pamirs and parts of Afghanistan. In 509, they captured Sogdia and they took 'Sughd' (the capital of Sogdiana).

To the east, they captured the Tarim Basin and went as far as Urumqi.

Around 560 CE their empire was destroyed by an alliance of the First Turkic Khaganate and the Sasanian Empire, but some of them remained as local rulers in the region of Tokharistan for the next 150 years, under the suzerainty of the Western Turks, followed by the Tokhara Yabghus. Among the principalities which remained in Hephthalite hands even after the Turkic overcame their territory were: Chaganian, and Khuttal in the Vakhsh Valley.

Ascendancy over the Sasanian Empire (442- c.530 CE) 

The Hephthalites were originally vassals of the Rouran Khaganate but split from their overlords in the early fifth century. The next time they were mentioned was in Persian sources as foes of Yazdegerd II (435–457), who from 442, fought 'tribes of the Hephthalites', according to the Armenian Elisee Vardaped.

In 453, Yazdegerd moved his court east to deal with the Hephthalites or related groups.

In 458, a Hephthalite king called Akhshunwar helped the Sasanian Emperor Peroz I (458–484) gain the Persian throne from his brother. Before his accession to the throne, Peroz had been the Sasanian for Sistan in the far east of the Empire, and therefore had been one of the first to enter into contact with the Hephthalites and request their help.

The Hephthalites may have also helped the Sasanians to eliminate another Hunnic tribe, the Kidarites: by 467, Peroz I, with Hephthalite aid, reportedly managed to capture Balaam and put an end to Kidarite rule in Transoxiana once and for all. The weakened Kidarites had to take refuge in the area of Gandhara.

Victories over the Sasanian Empire (474–484 CE) 
Later, however, from 474 CE, Peroz I fought three wars with his former allies the Hephthalites. In the first two, he himself was captured and ransomed. Following his second defeat, he had to offer thirty mules loaded with silver drachms to the Hephthalites, and also had to leave his son Kavad as a hostage. The coinage of Peroz I in effect flooded Tokharistan, taking precedence over all other Sasanian issues.

In the third battle, at the Battle of Herat (484), he was vanquished by the Hepthalite king Kun-khi, and for the next two years the Hephthalites plundered and controlled the eastern part of the Sasanian Empire. Perozduxt, the daughter of Peroz, was captured and became a lady as the Hephtalite court, as Queen of king Kun-khi. She became pregnant and had a daughter who would later marry her uncle Kavad I. From 474 until the middle of the 6th century, the Sasanian Empire paid tribute to the Hephthalites.

Bactria came under formal Hephthalite rule from that time. Taxes were levied by the Hephthalites over the local population: a contract in the Bactrian language from the archive of the Kingdom of Rob, has been found, which mentions taxes from the Hephthalites, requiring the sale of land in order to pay these taxes. It is dated to 483/484 CE.

Hephthalite coinage 
With the Sasanian Empire paying a heavy tribute, from 474, the Hephthalites themselves adopted the winged, triple-crescent crowned Peroz I as the design for their coinage. Benefiting from the influx of Sasanian silver coins, the Hephthalites did not develop their own coinage: they either minted coins with the same designs as the Sasanians, or simply countermarked Sasanian coins with their own symbols. They did not inscribe the name of their ruler, contrary to the habit of the Alchon Huns or the Kidarites before them. Exceptionally, one coin type deviates from the Sasanian design, by showing the bust of a Hepthalite prince holding a drinking cup. Overall, the Sasanians paid "an enormous tribute" to the Hephthalites, until the 530s and the rise of Khosrow I.

Protectors of Kavad 
Following their victory over Peroz I, the Hepthalites became protectors and benefactors of his son Kavad I, as Balash, a brother of Peroz took the Sasanian throne. In 488, a Hepthalite army vanquished the Sasaniana army of Balash, and was able to put Kavad I (488–496, 498–531) on the throne.

In 496–498, Kavad I was overthrown by the nobles and clergy, escaped, and restored himself with a Hephthalite army. Joshua the Stylite reports numerous instances in which Kavadh led Hepthalite ("Hun") troops, in the capture of the city of Theodosiupolis of Armenia in 501–502, in battles against the Romans in 502–503, and again during the siege of Edessa in September 503.

Hephthalites in Tokharistan (466 CE) 

Around 461–462 CE, an Alchon Hun ruler named Mehama is known to have been based in Eastern Tokharistan, possibly indicating a partition of the region between the Hephthalites in western Tokharistan, centered on Balkh, and the Alchon Huns in eastern Tokharistan, who would then go on to expand into northern India. Mehama appears in a letter in the Bactrian language he wrote in 461–462 CE, where he describes himself as "Meyam, King of the people of Kadag, the governor of the famous and prosperous King of Kings Peroz". Kadag is Kadagstan, an area in southern Bactria, in the region of Baghlan. Significantly, he presents himself as a vassal of the Sasanian Empire king Peroz I, but Mehama was probably later able to wrestle autonomy or even independence as Sasanian power waned and he moved into India, with dire consequences for the Gupta Empire.

The Hepthalites probably expanded into Tokharistan following the destruction of the Kidarites in 466. The presence of the Hepthalites in Tokharistan (Bactria) is securely dated to 484 CE, date of a tax receipt from the Kingdom of Rob mentioning the need to sell some land in order to pay Hephthalite taxes. Two documents were also found, with dates from the period from 492 to 527 CE, mentioning taxes paid to Hephthalite rulers. Another, undated documents, mentions scribal and judiciary functions under the Hephthalites:

Hephthalite conquest of Sogdiana (479 CE) 

The Hephthalites conquered the territory of Sogdiana, beyond the Oxus, which was incorporated into their Empire. They may have conquered Sogdiana as early as 479 CE, as this is the date of the last known embassy of the Sogdians to China. The account of the Liang Zhigongtu also seems to record that from around 479 CE, the Hephthalites occupied the region of Samarkand. Alternatively, the Hephthalites may have occupied Sogdia later in 509 CE, as this is the date of the last known embassy from Samarkand to the Chinese Empire, but this might not be conclusive as several cities, such as Balkh or Kobadiyan, are known to have sent embassies to China as late as 522 CE, while under Hephthalite control. As early as 484, the famous Hephthalite ruler Akhshunwar, who defeated Peroz I, held a title that may be understood as Sogdian: "’xs’wnd’r" ("power-holder").

The Hephthalites may have built major fortified Hippodamian cities (rectangular walls with an orthogonal network of streets) in Sogdiana, such as Bukhara and Panjikent, as they had also in Herat, continuing the city-building efforts of the Kidarites. The Hephthalites probably ruled over a confederation of local rulers or governors, linked through alliance agreements. One of these vassals may have been Asbar, ruler of Vardanzi, who also minted his own coinage during the period.

The wealth of the Sasanian ransoms and tributes may have been reinvested in Sogdia, possibly explaining the prosperity of the region from that time. Sogdia, at the center of a new Silk Road between China to the Sasanian Empire and the Byzantine Empire became extremely prosperous under its nomadic elites. The Hephthalites took on the role of major intermediary on the Silk Road, after their great predecessor the Kushans, and contracted local Sogdians to carry on the trade of silk and other luxury goods between the China Empire and the Sasanian Empire.

Because of the Hephthalite occupation of Sogdia, the original coinage of Sogdia came to be flooded by the influx of Sasanian coins received as a tribute to the Hephthalites. This coinage then spread along the Silk Road. The symbol of the Hephthalites appears on the residual coinage of Samarkand, probably as a consequence of the Hephthalite control of Sogdia, and becomes prominent in Sogdian coinage from 500 to 700 CE, including in the coinage of their indigenous successors the Ikhshids (642-755 CE), ending with the Muslim conquest of Transoxiana.

Tarim Basin (circa 480–550 CE) 

In the late 5th century CE they expanded eastward through the Pamir Mountains, which are comparatively easy to cross, as did the Kushans before them, due to the presence of convenient plateaus between high peaks. They occupied the western Tarim Basin (Kashgar and Khotan), taking control of the area from the Ruanruans, who had been collecting heavy tribute from the oasis cities, but were now weakening under the assaults of the Chinese Northern Wei dynasty. In 479 they took the east end of the Tarim Basin, around the region of Turfan. In 497–509, they pushed north of Turfan to the Urumchi region. In the early years of the 6th century, they were sending embassies from their dominions in the Tarim Basin to the Northern Wei dynasty. They were probably in contact with Li Xian, the Chinese Governor of Dunhuang, who is known for having furnished his tomb with a Western-style ewer probably made in Bactria.

The Hephthalites continued to occupy the Tarim Basin until the end of their Empire, circa 560 CE.

As the territories ruled by the Hephthalites expanded into Central Asia and the Tarim Basin, the art of the Hephthalites, characterized by the clothing and hairstyles of the figures being represented, also came to be used in the areas they ruled, such as Sogdiana, Bamyan or Kucha in the Tarim Basin (Kizil Caves, Kumtura Caves, Subashi reliquary). In these areas appear dignitaries with caftans with a triangular collar on the right side, crowns with three crescents, some crowns with wings, and a unique hairstyle. Another marker is the two-point suspension system for swords, which seems to have been an Hephthalite innovation, and was introduced by them in the territories they controlled. The paintings from the Kucha region, particularly the swordsmen in the Kizil Caves, appear to have been made during Hephthalite rule in the region, circa 480–550 CE. The influence of the art of Gandhara in some of the earliest paintings at the Kizil Caves, dated to circa 500 CE, is considered as a consequence of the political unification of the area between Bactria and Kucha under the Hephthalites. Some words of the Tocharian languages may have been adopted from the Hephthalites in the 6th century CE.

The early Turks of the First Turkic Khaganate then took control of the Turfan and Kucha areas from around 560 CE, and, in alliance with the Sasanian Empire, became instrumental in the fall of the Hepthalite Empire.

Hephthalite embassies to Liang China (516–526 CE) 

An illustrated account of a Hepthalite (滑, Hua) embassy to the Chinese court of the Southern Liang in the capital Jingzhou in 516–526 CE is given in Portraits of Periodical Offering of Liang, originally painted by Pei Ziye or the future Emperor Yuan of Liang while he was a Governor of the Province of Jingzhou as a young man between 526 and 539 CE, and of which an 11th-century Song copy is preserved. The text explains how small the country of the Hua was when they were still vassals of the Rouran Khaganate, and how they later moved to "Moxian", possibly referring to their occupation of Sogdia, and then conquered numerous neighbouring country, including the Sasanian Empire:

The Portraits of Periodical Offering of Liang mentions that no envoys from the Hephthalites came before 516 to the southern court, and it was only in that year that a Hephthalite King named Yilituo Yandai (姓厭帶名夷栗陁) sent an ambassador named Puduoda[] (蒲多达[], possibly a Buddhist name "Buddhadatta" or "Buddhadāsa"). In 520, another ambassador named Fuheliaoliao (富何了了) visited the Liang court, bringing a yellow lion, a white marten fur coat and Persian brocade as present. Another ambassador named Kang Fuzhen (康符真), followed with presents as well (in 526 CE according to the Liangshu). Their language had to be translated by the Tuyuhun.

In Portraits of Periodical Offering of Liang, the Hepthalithes are treated as the most important foreign state, as they occupy the leading position, at the front of the column of foreign ambassadors, and have by far the largest descriptive text. The Hepthalites were, according to the Liangshu (Chap.54), accompanied in their embassy by three states: Humidan (胡蜜丹), Yarkand (周古柯, Khargalik) and Kabadiyan (呵跋檀). The envoys from right to left were: the Hephthalites (滑/嚈哒), Persia (波斯), Korea (百濟), Kucha (龜茲), Japan (倭), Malaysia (狼牙脩), Qiang (鄧至), Yarkand (周古柯, Zhouguke, "near Hua"), Kabadiyan (呵跋檀 Hebatan, "near Hua"), Kumedh (胡蜜丹, Humidan, "near Hua"), Balkh (白題, Baiti, "descendants of the Xiongnu and east of the Hua"), and finally Merv (末).

Most of the ambassadors from Central Asia are shown wearing heavy beards and relatively long hair, but, in stark contrast, the Hephthalite ambassador, as well as the ambassador from Balkh, are clean-shaven and bare-headed, and their hair is cropped short. These physical characteristics are also visible in many of the Central Asian seals of the period.

Other embassies 
Overall, Chinese chronicles recorded twenty-four Hephthalite embassies: the first embassy in 456, and the others from 507 to 558 CE (including fifteen to the Northern Wei until the end of this dynasty in 535, and five to the Southern Liang in 516–541). The last three are mentioned in the Zhoushu, which records that the Hepththalites had conquered Anxi, Yutian (Hotan region in Xinjiang) and more than twenty other countries, and that they sent embassies to the Chinese court of the Western Wei and Northern Zhou in 546, 553 and 558 CE respectively, after what the Hepthalites were "crushed by the Turks" and embassies stopped.

Buddhas of Bamyan (544–644 CE) 

The complex of the Buddhas of Bamyan was developed under Hephthalite rule. Carbon dating of the structural components of the Buddhas has determined that the smaller  "Eastern Buddha" was built around 570 CE (544–595 CE with 95% probability), while the larger  "Western Buddha" was built around 618 CE (591–644 CE with 95% probability). This corresponds to the period soon before or after the major defeat of the Hephthalites against the combined forces of Western Turk and Sasanian Empire (557 CE), or the following period during which they regrouped south of the Oxus as Principalities, but essentially before the Western Turks finally overran the region to form the Tokhara Yabghus (625 CE).

Among the most famous paintings of the Buddhas of Bamyan, the ceiling of the smaller Eastern Buddha represents a solar deity on a chariot pulled by horses, as well as ceremonial scenes with royal figures and devotees. The god is wearing a caftan in the style of Tokhara, boots, and is holding a lance, he is "The Sun God and a Golden Chariot Rising in Heaven". His representation is derived from the iconography of the Iranian god Mithra, as revered in Sogdia. He is riding a two-wheeled golden charriot, pulled by four horses. Two winged attendants are standing to the side of the charriot, wearing a Corinthian helmet with a feather, and holding a shield. In the top portion are wind gods, flying with a scarf held in both hands. This great composition is unique, and has no equivalent in Gandhara or India, but there are some similarities with the painting of Kizil or Dunhuang.

The central image of the Sun God on his golden chariot is framed by two lateral rows in individuals: Kings and dignitaries mingling with Buddhas and Bodhisattvas. One of the personages, standing behind a monk in profile, much be the King of Bamyan. He wears a crenalated crown with single crescent and korymbos, a round-neck tunic and a Sasanian headband. Several of the figures, either royal couples, crowned individuals or richly dressed women, have the characteristic appearance of the Hephthalites of Tokharistan, with belted jackets with a unique lapel of their tunic being folded on the right side, the cropped hair, the hair accessories, their distinctive physionomy and their round beardless faces. These figures must represent the donors and potentates who supported the building of the monumental giant Buddha. They are gathered around the Seven Buddhas of the past and Maitreya. The individuals in this painting are very similar to the individuals depicted in Balalyk Tepe, and they may be related to the Hepthalites. They participate "to the artistic tradition of the Hephthalite ruling classes of Tukharestan".

These murals disappeared with the destruction of the statues by the Taliban in 2001.

Hephthalite royals on the tombs of Sogdian traders

The Tomb of Wirkak is the tomb of a 6th century Sogdian trader established in China, and discovered in Xi'an. It seems that depictions of Hephthalite rulers are omnipresent in the pictorial decorations of the tomb, as royal figures with elaborate Sasanian-type crowns appearing in their palaces, nomadic yurts or while hunting. Hephthalites rulers are shown short-haired, wearing tunics, and are often depicted together with their female consort. The Sogdian trader Wirkak may therefore have primarily dealt with the Hephthalites during his young years (he was around 60 when the Hephthalites were finally destroyed by the alliance of the Sasanians and the Turks between 556 and 560 CE). The Hephthalites also appear in four panels of the Miho funerary couch (c.570 CE) with somewhat caricatural features, and characteristics of vassals to the Turks. On the contrary, the depictions in the tombs of later Sogdian traders, such as the Tomb of An Jia (who was 24 years younger than Wirwak), already show the omnipresence of the Turks of the First Turkic Khaganate, who were probably his main trading partners during his active life.

End of the Empire and fragmentation into Hephthalite Principalities (560–710 CE) 

After Kavad I, the Hephthalites seem to have shifted their attention away from the Sasanian Empire, and Kavad's successor Khosrow I (531–579) was able to resume an expansionist policy to the east. According to al-Tabari, Khosrow I managed, through his expansionsit policy, to take control of "Sind, Bust, Al-Rukkhaj, Zabulistan, Tukharistan, Dardistan, and Kabulistan" as he ultimately defeated the Hephthalites with the help of the First Turkic Khaganate.

In 552, the Göktürks took over Mongolia, formed the First Turkic Khaganate, and by 558 reached the Volga. Circa 555–567, the Turks of the First Turkic Khaganate and the Sasanians under Khosrow I allied against the Hephthalites and defeated them after an eight-day battle near Qarshi, the Battle of Bukhara, perhaps in 557.

These events put an end to the Hephthalite Empire, which fragmented into semi-independent Principalities, paying tribute to either the Sasanians or the Turks, depending on the military situation. After the defeat, the Hephthalites withdrew to Bactria and replaced king Gatfar with Faghanish, the ruler of Chaghaniyan. Thereafter, the area around the Oxus in Bactria contained numerous Hephthalites principalities, remnants of the great Hephthalite Empire destroyed by the alliance of the Turks and the Sasanians. They are reported in the Zarafshan valley, Chaghaniyan, Khuttal, Termez, Balkh, Badghis, Herat and Kabul, in the geographical areas corresponding to Tokharistan and today's northern Afghanistan.

The Sasanians and Turks established a frontier for their zones of influence along the Oxus river, and the Hephthalite Principalities functioned as buffer states between two Empires. But when the Hephthalites chose Faghanish as their king in Chaganiyan, Khosrow I crossed the Oxus and put the Principalities of Chaghaniyan and Khuttal under tribute.

When Khosrow I died in 579, the Hephthalites of Tokharistan and Khotan took advantage of the situation to rebel against the Sasanians, but their efforts were obliterated by the Turks. By 581 or before, the western part of the First Turkic Khaganate separated and became the Western Turkic Khaganate. In 588, triggering the First Perso-Turkic War, the Turkic Khagan Bagha Qaghan (known as Sabeh/Saba in Persian sources), together with his Hephthalite subjects, invaded the Sasanian territories south of the Oxus, where they attacked and routed the Sasanian soldiers stationed in Balkh, and then proceeded to conquer the city along with Talaqan, Badghis, and Herat. They were finally repelled by the Sasanian general Vahram Chobin.

Raids into the Sasanid Empire (600–610 CE) 

Circa 600, the Hephthalites were raiding the Sasanian Empire as far as Ispahan (Spahan) in central Iran. The Hephthalites issued numerous coins imitating the coinage of Khosrow II, adding on the obverse a Hephthalite signature in Sogdian and a Tamgha symbol .

Circa 606/607 CE the Second Perso-Turkic War started, when the Göktürks and Hephthalites again invaded the Sasanian Empire. Khosrow recalled Smbat IV Bagratuni from Persian Armenia and sent him to Iran to repel the invaders. Smbat, with the aid of a Persian prince named Datoyean, repelled the Hephthalites from Persia, and plundered their domains in eastern Khorasan, where Smbat is said to have killed their king in single combat. Khosrow then gave Smbat the honorific title Khosrow Shun ("the Joy or Satisfaction of Khosrow"), while his son Varaztirots II Bagratuni received the honorific name Javitean Khosrow ("Eternal Khosrow").

Western Turk takeover (625 CE) 

From 625 CE, the territory of the Hephthalites from Tokharistan to Kabulistan was taken over by the Western Turks, forming an entity ruled by Western Turk nobles, the Tokhara Yabghus. The Tokhara Yabghus or "Yabghus of Tokharistan", were a dynasty of Western Turk sub-kings, with the title "Yabghus", who ruled from 625 CE south of the Oxus river, in the area of Tokharistan and beyond, with some smaller polities surviving in the area of Badakhshan until 758 CE. Their legacy was extended to the southeast until the 9th century CE, with the Turk Shahis and the Zunbils.

Arab invasion (c.651 CE) 
Circa 650 CE, during the Arab conquest of the Sasanian Empire, the Sasanian Empire ruler Yazdegerd III was trying to regroup and gather forces around Tokharistan and was hoping to obtain the help of the Turks, after his defeat to the Arabs in the Battle of Nihâvand (642 CE). Yazdegerd was initially supported by the Hephthalite Principality of Chaghaniyan, which sent him troops to aid him against the Arabs. But when Yazdegerd arrived in Merv (in what is today's Turkmenistan) he demanded tax from the Marzban of Marw, losing his support and making him ally with the Hephthalite ruler of Badghis, Nezak Tarkan. The Hepthalite ruler of Badghis allied with the Marzban of Merv attack Yazdegerd and defeated him in 651. Yazdegerd III barely escaped with his life but was murdered in the vicinity of Merv soon after, and the Arabs managed to capture the city of Merv the same year.

In 652 CE, following the Siege of Herat (652) to which the Hephthalites participated, the Arabs captured the cities of northern Tokharistan, Balkh included, and the Hepthalites principalities were forced to pay tribute and accept Arab garrisons. The Hephthalites again rebelled in 654 CE, leading to the Battle of Badghis.

In 659, Chinese chronicles still mentioned the "Hephtalite Tarkans" (悒達太汗 Yida Taihan, probably related to "Nezak Tarkan"), as some of the rulers in Tokharistan who remained theoretically subjects to the Chinese Empire, and whose main city was Huolu 活路 (modern Mazār-e Sherif, Afghanistan).

The city of Merv became the base of the Arabs for their Central Asian operations. The Arabs weakened during the 4-year civil war leading to the establishment of the Umayyad Caliphate in 661, but they were able to continue their expansion after that.

Hephthalite revolts against the Ummayad Caliphate (689–710 CE) 

Circa 689 CE, the Hephthalite ruler of Badghis and the Arab rebel Musa ibn Abd Allah ibn Khazim, son of the Zubayrid governor of Khurasan Abd Allah ibn Khazim al-Sulami, allied against the forces of the Umayyad Caliphate. The Hepthalites and their allies captured Termez in 689, repelled the Arabs, and occupied the whole region of Khorasan for a brief period, with Termez as they capital, described by the Arabs as "the headquarters of the Hephthalites" (dār mamlakat al-Hayāṭela). The Arabs of the Umayyad Caliphate under Yazid ibn al-Muhallab re-captured Termez in 704. Nezak Tarkan, the ruler of the Hephthalites of Badghis, led a new revolt in 709 with the support of other principalities as well as his nominal ruler, the Yabghu of Tokharistan. In 710, Qutaiba ibn Muslim was able to re-establish Muslim control over Tokharistan and captured Nizak Tarkan who was executed on al-Hajjaj's orders, despite promises of pardon, while the Yabghu was exiled to Damascus and kept there as a hostage.

In 718 CE, Chinese chronicles still mention the Hephthalites (悒達 Yida) as one of the polities under the suzerainty of the Turkic Tokhara Yabghus, capable of providing 50,000 soldiers at the service of its overlord. Some remnants, not necessarily dynastic, of the Hephthalite confederation would be incorporated into the Göktürks, as an Old Tibetan document, dated to the 8th century, mentioned the tribe Heb-dal among 12 Dru-gu tribes ruled by Eastern Turkic khagan Bug-chor, i.e. Qapaghan Qaghan Chinese chronicles report embassies from the "Hephtalite kingdom" as late as 748 CE.

Military and weapons 

The Hephthalites were considered as a powerful military force. Depending on sources, their main weapon was the bow, the mace or the sword. Judging from their military achievements, they probably had a strong cavalry. In Persia, according to the 6th century Armenian chronicler Lazar of P’arpec’i:

"Hunnic" designs in weaponry are known to have influenced Sasanian designs during the 6th–7th century CE, just before Islamic invasions. The Sasanians adopted Hunnish nomadic designs for straight iron swords and their gold-covered scabbards. This is particularly the case of two-straps suspension design, in which straps of different lengths were attached to a P-shaped projection on the scabbard, so that the sword could be held sideways, making it easier to draw, especially when on horseback. The two-point suspension system for swords is considered to have been introduced by the Hephthalites in Central Asia and in the Sasanian Empire and is a marker of their influence, and the design was generally introduced by them in the territories they controlled. The first example of two-suspension sword in Sasanian art occurs in a relief of Taq-i Bustan dated to the time of Khusro II (590–628 CE), and is thought to have been adopted from the Hepthalites.

Swords with ornate cloisonné designs and two-straps suspensions, as found in the paintings of Penjikent and Kizil and in archaeological excavations, may be versions of the daggers produced under Hephthalite influence. Weapons with Hunnic designs are depicted in the "Cave of the Painters" in the Kizil Caves, in a mural showing armoured warriors and dated to the 5th century CE. Their sword guards have typical Hunnish designs of rectangle or oval shapes with cloisonné ornamentation.

Lamellar helmets were also popularized by the steppe nomads, and were adopted by the Sasanian Empire when they took control of former Hephthalite territory. This type of helmet appears in sculptures on pillar capitals at Ṭāq-e Bostān and Behistun, and on the Anahita coinage of Khosrow II (r. 590–628 CE).

Religion and culture 

They were said to practice polyandry and artificial cranial deformation. Chinese sources said they worshiped 'foreign gods', 'demons', the 'heaven god' or the 'fire god'. The Gokturks told the Byzantines that they had walled cities. Some Chinese sources said that they had no cities and lived in tents. Litvinsky tries to resolve this by saying that they were nomads who moved into the cities they had conquered. There were some government officials but central control was weak and local dynasties paid tribute.

According to Song Yun, the Chinese Buddhist monk who visited the Hephthalite territory in 540 and "provides accurate accounts of the people, their clothing, the empresses and court procedures and traditions of the people and he states the Hephthalites did not recognize the Buddhist religion and they preached pseudo gods, and killed animals for their meat." It is reported that some Hephthalites often destroyed Buddhist monasteries but these were rebuilt by others. According to Xuanzang, the third Chinese pilgrim who visited the same areas as Song Yun about 100 years later, the capital of Chaghaniyan had five monasteries.

According to historian André Wink, "...in the Hephthalite dominion Buddhism was predominant but there was also a religious sediment of Zoroastrianism and Manichaeism." Balkh had some 100 Buddhist monasteries and 30,000 monks. Outside the town was a large Buddhist monastery, later known as Naubahar.

There were Christians among the Hephthalites by the mid-6th century, although nothing is known of how they were converted. In 549, they sent a delegation to Aba I, the patriarch of the Church of the East, asking him to consecrate a priest chosen by them as their bishop, which the patriarch did. The new bishop then performed obeisance to both the patriarch and the Sasanian king, Khosrow I. The seat of the bishopric is not known, but it may have been Badghis–Qadištan, the bishop of which, Gabriel, sent a delegate to the synod of Patriarch Ishoyahb I in 585. It was probably placed under the metropolitan of Herat. The church's presence among the Hephthalites enabled them to expand their missionary work across the Oxus. In 591, some Hephthalites serving in the army of the rebel Bahram Chobin were captured by Khosrow II and sent to the Roman emperor Maurice as a diplomatic gift. They had Nestorian crosses tattooed on their foreheads.

Hephthalite seals 

Several seals found in Bactria and Sogdia have been attributed to the Hephthalites.
 The "Hephthalite Yabghu seal" shows a Hephthalite ruler with a radiate crown, royal ribbons and a beardless face, with the Bactrian script title "Ebodalo Yabghu" (  ηβοδαλο ββγο, "The Lord of the Hephthalites"), and has been dated to the end of the 5th century-early 6th century CE. This important seal was published by Judith A. Lerner and Nicholas Sims-Williams in 2011.
 Stamp seal (BM 119999) in the British Museum shows two facing figures, one bearded and wearing the Sasanian dress, and the other without facial hair and wearing a radiate crown, both being adorned with royal ribbons. This seal was initially dated to 300–350 CE and attributed to the Kushano-Sasanians, but has been more recently attributed to the Hephthalites, and dated to the 5th–6th century CE. Paleographically, the seal can be attributed to the 4th century or first half of the 5th century.
 The "Seal of Khingila" shows a beardless ruler with radiate crown and royal ribbons, wearing a single-lapel caftan, in the name of Eškiŋgil (εϸχιγγιλο), which could correspond to one of the rulers named Khingila (χιγγιλο), or may be a Hunnic title meaning "Companion of the Sword", or even "Companion of the God of War".

Local populations under the Hephthalites 
The Hephthalites governed a confederation of various people, many of whom were probably of Iranian descent, speaking an Iranian language. Several cities, such as Balkh, Kobadiyan and possibly Samarkand, were allowed to send regional embassies to China while under Hephthalite control. Several portraits of regional ambassadors from the territories occupied by the Hephthalites (Tokharistan, Tarim Basin) are known from Chinese paintings such as the Portraits of Periodical Offering of Liang, originally painted in 526–539 CE. They were at that time under the overlorship of the Hephthalites, who led the embassies to the Southern Liang court in the early 6th century CE. A century later, under the Tang dynasty, portraits of the local people of Tokharistan were again illustrated in The Gathering of Kings, circa 650 CE. Etienne de la Vaissière has estimated the local population of each major oasis in Tokharistan and Western Turkestan during the period to around several hundreds of thousands each, while the major oasis of the Tarim Basin are more likely to have had populations ranging in the tens of thousands each.

The Alchon Huns (formerly considered as a branch of the Hephthalites) in South Asia 

The Alchon Huns, who invaded northern India and were known there as "Hūṇas", have long been considered as a part or a sub-division of the Hephthalites, or as their eastern branch, but now tend to be considered as a separate entity, who may have been displaced by the settlement of the Hephthalites in Bactria. Historians such as Beckwith, referring to Étienne de la Vaissière, say that the Hephthalites were not necessarily one and the same as the Hunas (Sveta Huna). According to de la Vaissiere, the Hephthalites are not directly identified in classical sources alongside that of the Hunas. They were initially based in the Oxus basin in Central Asia and established their control over Gandhara in the northwestern part of the Indian subcontinent by about 465 CE. From there, they fanned out into various parts of northern, western, and central India.

In India, these invading people were called Hunas, or "Sveta Huna" (White Huns) in Sanskrit. The Hūṇas are mentioned in several ancient texts such as the Rāmāyaṇa, Mahābhārata, Purāṇas, and Kalidasa's Raghuvaṃśa. The first Hunas, probably Kidarites, were initially defeated by Emperor Skandagupta of the Gupta Empire in the 5th century CE. In the early 6th century CE, the Alchon Hun Hunas in turn overran the part of the Gupta Empire that was to their southeast and had conquered Central and North India. Gupta Emperor Bhanugupta defeated the Hunas under Toramana in 510, and his son Mihirakula was repulsed by Yashodharman in 528 CE. The Hunas were driven out of India by the kings Yasodharman and Narasimhagupta, during the early 6th century.

Possible descendants 
A number of groups may have descended from the Hephthalites.
 Avars: suggestions have been made that the Pannonian Avars were Hepthalites who went to Europe after their collapse in 557 CE, but this is not adequately supported by archaeological or written sources.
 Pashtuns: The Hephthalites may have contributed to the ethnogenesis of Pashtuns. Yu. V. Gankovsky, a Soviet historian on Afghanistan, stated: "Pashtun began as a union of largely East Iranian tribes, which became the initial ethnic stratum of the Pashtun ethnogenesis dating from the middle of the first millennium CE, and is connected with the dissolution of the Hephthalite confederacy."
 Durrani: The Durrani Pashtuns of Afghanistan were called "Abdali" before 1747. According to linguist Georg Morgenstierne, their tribal name Abdālī may have "something to do with" the Hephthalite. This hypothesis was endorsed by historian Aydogdy Kurbanov, who indicated that after the collapse of the Hephthalite confederacy, they likely assimilated into different local populations and that the Abdali may be one of the tribes of Hephthalite origin.

 Khalaj: The Khalaj people are first mentioned in the 7th–9th centuries in the area of Ghazni, Qalati Ghilji, and Zabulistan in present-day Afghanistan. They spoke Khalaj Turkic. Al-Khwarizmi mentioned them as a remnant tribe of the Hephthalites. However, according to linguist Sims-Williams, archaeological documents do not support the suggestion that the Khalaj were the Hephthalites' successors, while according to historian V. Minorsky, the Khalaj were "perhaps only politically associated with the Hephthalites." Some of the Khalaj were later Pashtunized, after which they transformed into the Pashtun Ghilji tribe.
 Kanjina: a Saka tribe linked to the Indo-Iranian Kumijis and incorporated into the Hephthalites. Kanjinas were possibly Turkicized later, as al-Khwarizmi called them "Kanjina Turks". However, Bosworth and Clauson contended that al-Khwarizmi was simply using "Turks" "in the vague and inaccurate sense".
 Karluks: (or Qarlughids) were reported as settled in Ghazni and Zabulistan, present-day Afghanistan, in the thirteenth century. Many Muslim geographers identified "Karluks" Khallukh ~ Kharlukh with "Khalajes" Khalaj from confusion, as the two names were similar and these two groups dwelt near each other.
 Abdal is a name associated with the Hephthalites. It is an alternate name for the Äynu people.
 According to Orhan Köprülü, Abdal of Turkey might be descended from the Hepthalites. Albert von Le Coq mentions the relation between Abdals of Adana and Äynus of East Turkestan, by them having some common words, and by both referring to themselves as Abdals and speaking an exclusive language among themselves. Some Abdal elements can also be found in the composition of Azerbaijanis, Turkmen (Ata, Chowdur, Ersary, Saryk), Kazakhs, Uzbek-Lokays, Turks and Volga Bulgars (Savirs).

Hephthalite rulers 

 Akhshunwar, circa 458 CE
 Kun-khi, circa 484 CE
 Yandai Yilituo, circa 516 CE (only known from his Chinese name 厭帶夷栗陁)
 Hwade-gang (only known from the archives of the Kingdom of Rob).
 Ghadfar/Ghatifar, circa 567–568 CE.
 Faghanish (568-) (ruling in Chaghaniyan)
 Nezak Tarkan (circa 650–710)

See also 
 History of Afghanistan
 Huna people
 Kidarites (Red Huns)
 Alchon Huns
 Kushan Empire
 Xionites
 Nezak Huns
 Iranian Huns

Notes

References

Sources 

 
 
 
 
 
 . 4-volume set.
 
 
 
 
 
  Internet Archive copy
 
 
 
 
  Internet Archive Google Books
 
 
 
 
 
 
 
 
 
 
  Alternate PDF
 
 
 
 
 
 
  Internet Archive

Further reading

External links 

 "The Ethnonym Apar in the Turkish Inscriptions of the VIII. Century and Armenian Manuscripts" Dr. Mehmet Tezcan.
 The Anthropology of Yanda (Chinese) pdf
 The Silkroad Foundation
 
 Columbia Encyclopedia: Hephthalites
 Hephthalite coins
 
 The Hephthalites of Central Asia – by Richard Heli (long article with a timeline)
  Article archived from the University of Washington's Silk Road exhibition – has a slightly adapted form of the Richard Heli timeline.
 (pdf) The Ethnonym Apar in the Turkish Inscriptions of the VIII. Century and Armenian Manuscripts – Mehmet Tezcan
 Records Relevant to the Hephthalites in Ancient Chinese Historical Works, collected by Yu Taishan (2016).

 
Nomadic groups in Eurasia
Former countries in Central Asia
Former countries in South Asia
History of Pakistan
Medieval Afghanistan
Medieval Khorasan
States and territories established in the 440s
670 disestablishments
Former empires